The Eagles of Whirlwind (Nusour al Zawba'a) are the armed wing of the Syrian Social National Party. Around 6,000 to 8,000 men strong, they have participated in many battles and operations throughout the Syrian civil war fighting alongside the Syrian Arab Army and its allies and participating in various military operations.

After the escalation of the crisis in Syria to an armed conflict and later full-scale civil war, the Eagles largely grew and their fighters were primarily deployed in the governorates of Homs and Damascus and were said to be the most formidable military force other than the Syrian Arab Army in Suweida.

Their most notable military operations is their participation in the battles of Sadad, Ma'loula, and al-Qaryatayn, among others. Party officials say its membership has increased "by the thousands" since the start of the war as a result of its alleged "reputation as an effective fighting force in Syria".

Ideology

The eagles are the armed wing of the SSNP and thus share the same ideologies and goals. The SSNP's core ideology is Syrian nationalism and the belief in the concept of a 'Greater Syria' or 'Natural Syria' which extends from the Taurus range north of Syria to the Suez Canal in Egypt, thus encompassing the modern boundaries of Syria, Lebanon, Iraq, Kuwait, Jordan, Palestine, Israel and parts of Egypt, Turkey and Iran.

The SSNP and its armed wing has stood by the Syrian government.

See also
 List of armed groups in the Syrian Civil War
 Christians in Syria

References

Syrian Social Nationalist Party
Pro-government factions of the Syrian civil war
Military wings of nationalist parties
Axis of Resistance